The Glass Boat (French: Le bateau de verre, German: Das brennende Schiff) is a 1927 French-German silent film directed by Constantin J. David and Jacqueline Milliet and starring André Nox, Françoise Rosay and Eric Barclay.

The film's sets were designed by the art director Karl Görge.

Cast
 André Nox as Armand d'Arcy, Besitzer einer Glashütte  
 Françoise Rosay as Frau d'Arcy, seine Gattin  
 Eric Barclay as Robert d'Arcy, ihr Sohn  
 Mary Kid as Violet Blanchard, eine junge Schloßherrin  
 Käthe von Nagy as Anni  
 Arthur Duarte as Allan, Ihr Bruder  
 José Davert as Der Steuermann der 'Kerrock'  
 Mathilde Sussin as Tante Marie  
 Albert Paulig as Konsul Brown

References

Bibliography
 Goble, Alan. The Complete Index to Literary Sources in Film. Walter de Gruyter, 1999.

External links

1927 films
Films directed by Constantin J. David
French silent feature films
German silent feature films
Seafaring films
German black-and-white films
Silent adventure films
1920s French films